Kevin Forrest Cash (born December 6, 1977) is an American professional baseball manager and former player who is the manager of the Tampa Bay Rays of Major League Baseball (MLB). Previously, Cash played catcher in MLB for the Toronto Blue Jays, Tampa Bay Devil Rays, Boston Red Sox, New York Yankees, and Houston Astros. He was the bullpen coach for the Cleveland Indians before being hired as the Rays' manager in December 2014. Cash was the American League Manager of the Year in 2020 and 2021, the first AL manager to win the award consecutively.

Early life
Cash played for Northside Little League in Tampa, Florida, as a second baseman on the team that reached the 1989 Little League World Series. 

He later played college baseball for the Florida State Seminoles baseball team under head coach Mike Martin. While at Florida State, Cash started 148 games as an infielder. He batted .299 with a career on-base plus slugging (OPS) of .923. He also appeared in two College World Series (1998, 1999) for Florida State, including a second-place finish in 1999, when he was voted second-team All American at third base by the National Collegiate Baseball Writers Association (NCBWA). In the summer of 1999, he played for the Falmouth Commodores of the Cape Cod Baseball League. Cash asked to play catcher for Falmouth, and went on to earn league All-Star and team MVP honors. In August 1999, he signed with the Toronto Blue Jays as an undrafted free agent.

Playing career
Cash begin his professional playing career in 2000 with the Hagerstown Suns, a Class A farm team of the Blue Jays. He reached the Triple-A level in 2002.

Toronto Blue Jays
Cash first played in MLB during the 2002 season, appearing in seven games for Toronto. He went on to appear in a total of 101 games with the Blue Jays from 2002 through 2004, mainly as a backup catcher and defensive replacement, batting .173 with five home runs and 29 RBIs.

Tampa Bay Devil Rays
After the 2004 season, Cash was traded to the then-Tampa Bay Devil Rays for pitcher Chad Gaudin. With the Devil Rays in 2005, Cash appeared in 13 games, batting .161 with two home runs and two RBIs. On April 5, 2006, Cash was designated for assignment by Tampa Bay, and after clearing waivers, reported to the Triple-A Durham Bulls, where he spent the entire 2006 season, appearing in 78 games. After the season, he became a free agent.

Boston Red Sox

Cash signed a minor league contract with the Boston Red Sox on January 24, 2007.

On August 17, 2007, Red Sox backup catcher Doug Mirabelli pulled a calf muscle rounding third base in the first game of a doubleheader against the Los Angeles Angels of Anaheim. Cash was flown to Boston from Ottawa (where the Pawtucket Red Sox were playing the Ottawa Lynx) to catch in the nightcap of the doubleheader. He made it to Fenway Park after the game had started. He started the game on August 19 against the Angels.

On November 2, 2007, Cash opted for free agency after refusing to accept an outright assignment to the Triple-A Pawtucket Red Sox. On December 13, 2007, Cash re-signed with the Red Sox to a minor league contract and an invitation to spring training.

On March 25, 2008, Cash's contract was purchased. He acted as the personal catcher for knuckleball pitcher Tim Wakefield after Mirabelli left the Red Sox. Cash made his only postseason appearances as a player in 2008: in the Division Series, he caught two innings in one game without batting, and in the League Championship Series he appeared in three games (one start) and was 1-for-3 at the plate; his one hit was a home run. On December 12, 2008, Cash was non-tendered by the Red Sox, officially making him a free agent.

Overall, in 2007 and 2008 with Boston, Cash appeared in 73 games, batting .207 with three home runs and 19 RBIs. With the Red Sox, Cash wore the uniform number 36, except from August 16, 2008, to the end of that season, due to Paul Byrd joining the Red Sox and wearing 36, his customary number. During this period, Cash switched to number 30.

New York Yankees
On December 23, 2008, Cash signed a minor league deal with the New York Yankees with an invitation to spring training. He began the 2009 season with the Triple-A Scranton/Wilkes-Barre Yankees. On May 8, Cash was called up due to injuries to both Jorge Posada and José Molina. Cash was optioned back to Triple-A on May 29 and was placed on the disabled list after undergoing surgery to repair a torn rotator cuff. He had appeared in 10 games with the Yankees, batting .231 with three RBIs.

Released by the Yankees organization on September 5, 2009, Cash announced his retirement from baseball. However, he soon changed his mind, and on January 25, 2010, Cash signed a minor league contract with the Houston Astros.

Houston Astros
On May 5, 2010, Cash was called up to the Astros to replace a struggling J. R. Towles. Cash appeared in 20 games with Houston, batting .204 (11-for-54) with two home runs and four RBIs.

Boston Red Sox (second stint)
On July 1, 2010, Cash was acquired by the Red Sox for infielder Ángel Sánchez, after Boston catcher Jason Varitek went on the disabled list. As the backup catcher for the Red Sox for part of the season, Cash appeared in 29 games, batting .133 (8-for-60) with one RBI.

Cash finished the 2010 season with a combined .167 average (19-for-114) from his time with Houston and Boston. He refused a minor league assignment on October 12, and became a free agent. He signed a minor-league contract with the Texas Rangers on November 11, 2010, and played the entire 2011 season for their Triple-A affiliate, the Round Rock Express, appearing in 85 games and batting .244 in his final professional seasons as a player.

Playing career summary
Cash appeared in a total of 246 major league games across parts of eight seasons, batting .183 with 12 home runs and 58 RBIs. While primarily a catcher (241 games) he also made four appearances as a third baseman, two appearances as a designated hitter, and pitched in one game. His pitching appearance was for Houston on May 28, 2010, when he pitched one inning against the Cincinnati Reds, allowing three hits and one run. Defensively, Cash had a .993 fielding percentage as a catcher. He was only ejected once as a player, coming on September 7, 2007, after an altercation between the Red Sox and the Baltimore Orioles.

While Cash played for both the 2007 Red Sox and 2009 Yankees, teams that went on to win World Series, Cash was not on the postseason roster for either team; his only postseason appearances as a player came with the 2008 Red Sox.

Including the minor leagues, Cash had a 12-year professional playing career. He appeared in 678 minor league games, during which he batted .245 with 74 home runs and 332 RBIs. Cash was notable for wearing his plastic catcher's cap forward (similar to how a field player wears a normal baseball cap) under his mask; normally, catchers will turn the cap around to provide stability for their mask.

Post-playing career
On January 8, 2012, Cash announced his retirement as a player. He was announced as an advance scout for the Blue Jays during the 2012 season.

Coaching
Shortly after the 2012 season ended, Cash joined Terry Francona's staff with the Cleveland Indians as their bullpen coach. Cash played for Francona during his stints with the Red Sox, and joined fellow Red Sox alumnus Brad Mills, who became Cleveland's bench coach. Mills was Francona's bench coach while Cash played for the Red Sox, as well as Cash's manager with the Houston Astros in 2010. While in Cleveland, Cash recommended Yan Gomes to Chris Antonetti, the team's general manager. Cash served as the bullpen coach for Cleveland during the 2013 and 2014 seasons.

Managing

Tampa Bay Rays (2015–present)
On December 5, 2014, the Tampa Bay Rays hired Cash as their manager, succeeding Joe Maddon and becoming the youngest manager in the MLB. In 2015, Cash was successful on a lower percentage of replay challenges than any other MLB manager with 10 or more challenges, at 31.5%. In 2019, the Rays finished second in the AL East; they defeated the Oakland Athletics in the Wild Card Game, then fell to the Astros in the Division Series.

On September 1, 2020, New York Yankees pitcher Aroldis Chapman threw a pitch that narrowly missed the head of Rays batter Mike Brosseau. After the game, Cash warned the Yankees that "I got a whole damn stable full of guys that throw 98 mph. Period." Cash received a one-game suspension for his comments. The 2020 Rays finished first in the AL East, and advanced to the 2020 World Series via playoff wins over the Toronto Blue Jays (2–0), Yankees (3–2), and Houston Astros (4–3). The Rays went on to lose the World Series to the Los Angeles Dodgers (4-2). In a controversial decision in game six, Cash removed starting pitcher and former Cy Young award winner Blake Snell from the game in the sixth inning while holding a 1–0 lead. Snell had only allowed two hits while striking out nine batters. While the move was typical of the season long strategy for the Rays, many have pointed to the move of inserting reliver Nick Anderson as the real detriment, and Anderson himself accepted much of the blame. A normally dominant Anderson may have been overworked, having pitched over 14 innings in the 2020 playoffs. The move resulted in Dodger's outfielder Mookie Betts to double with a runner on, setting up World Series MVP Corey Seager to drive in the go ahead runs. This move sparked controversy from many members of the media, fans and some players including Snell himself. Cash said after the game "I guess I regret it because it didn't work out. But I feel like the thought process was right... Every decision that's made, that end result has a pretty weighing factor in how you feel about it. If we had to do it over again, I would have the utmost confidence in Nick Anderson to get through that inning.". On September 25, 2021, the Rays clinched their second straight division title. Cash said about the accomplishment "We've proven we're the best team in the American League for six months. Let's keep grinding, and let's do it for one more month and then see where we go.". In the 2021 American League Division Series, they faced the Boston Red Sox, who they had won eleven out of nineteen matchups in their divisional matchups. The Rays won the first game 5–0 on the strength of good hitting, which had continued to the second game when they scored five runs in the first inning of Game 2. However, Boston roared back to a 14–6 victory to even the Series. Game 3 went thirteen innings and saw Boston win 6–4 that was marred by a fateful double that potentially cost Tampa Bay a run. Boston promptly won Game 4 in the ninth inning to bury the Rays and end their postseason. In the 2022 American League Wild Card, the Cleveland Guardians would sweep Cash’s Rays including in walk-off fashion by Oscar Gonzalez.

Managerial record

Personal life
Cash is the nephew of former MLB utility player Ron Cash. Cash and his wife, Emily, live with their three children in Hillsborough County, Florida.

Awards and honors

1999 College World Series – Tallahassee Regional MVP
2001 Florida State League – All-Star Team
2002 All-Star Futures Game

References

External links

1977 births
Living people
American expatriate baseball players in Canada
Baseball coaches from Florida
Baseball players from Tampa, Florida
Boston Red Sox players
Cleveland Indians coaches
Dunedin Blue Jays players
Durham Bulls players
Florida State Seminoles baseball players
Gaither High School alumni
Hagerstown Suns players
Houston Astros players
Major League Baseball catchers
Manager of the Year Award winners
New York Yankees players
Pawtucket Red Sox players
Round Rock Express players
Scranton/Wilkes-Barre Yankees players
Syracuse SkyChiefs players
Tampa Bay Devil Rays players
Tampa Bay Rays managers
Tennessee Smokies players
Toronto Blue Jays players
Toronto Blue Jays scouts
Falmouth Commodores players